Adam Gregory Plutko (born October 3, 1991) is an American professional baseball pitcher for the LG Twins of the KBO League. He attended the University of California, Los Angeles (UCLA), where he played college baseball for the UCLA Bruins. He has previously played in Major League Baseball (MLB) for the Cleveland Indians and Baltimore Orioles.

Amateur career
Plutko attended Glendora High School in Glendora, California, and then enrolled at the University of California, Los Angeles (UCLA). Though he was selected by the Houston Astros in the sixth round of the 2010 Major League Baseball draft, he opted not to sign with the Astros.

At UCLA, Plutko was a member of the UCLA Bruins baseball team. He was teammates with future MLB All-Stars Gerrit Cole and Trevor Bauer. In 2013, Plutko led the Bruins to their first NCAA Championship in baseball by beating Mississippi State in the 2013 College World Series. During the World Series, he recorded wins against Louisiana State in the opening round of the World Series and in Game 1 of the Championship Series against Mississippi State. He was named the College World Series Most Outstanding Player.

Professional career

Cleveland Indians
The Cleveland Indians selected Plutko in the 11th round of the 2013 Major League Baseball draft. He signed with the Indians, but did not pitch for their Minor League Baseball affiliates that year due to a stress fracture in his shoulder. Plutko made his professional debut in 2014 with the Lake County Captains of the Class A Midwest League. In May, the Indians promoted Plutko to the Carolina Mudcats of the Class A-Advanced Carolina League. In 28 games started between the two teams he compiled a 7–10 record and 4.03 ERA. He began the 2015 season with the Lynchburg Hillcats of the Carolina League, and was promoted to the Akron RubberDucks of the Class AA Eastern League in May. Plutko posted a 13–7 record, a 2.39 ERA, and a 0.93 WHIP in 27 starts between the two clubs.

The Indians invited Plutko to spring training in 2016. He began the 2016 season with Akron and was promoted to the Columbus Clippers of the Class AAA International League on June 16.

On September 20, 2016, the Indians purchased Plutko's contract from the Clippers and added him to their active roster. In 28 starts for Akron and Columbus prior to his call up, he pitched to a 9–8 record and 3.73 ERA. He made his major league debut on September 24 as a relief pitcher.

Plutko spent all of 2017 with Columbus, going 7–12 with a 5.90 ERA in 24 games (22 starts). He began 2018 with Columbus, and was recalled on May 3 for one game. He was optioned back to Columbus the day after. He was recalled once again on May 23 to take over as the fifth starter for Cleveland after Josh Tomlin was moved to the bullpen. He was sent back to Columbus, and threw a no-hitter on June 2. He finished with a record of 4–5 in 17 games (12 starts). The following season, Plutko was 7–5 in  innings.

Before the 2020 season, Plutko was moved to the bullpen. He got a spot start in the second game of a doubleheader against the White Sox, where he went six innings and struck out four while allowing two runs.

With the 2020 Cleveland Indians, Plutko appeared in 10 games, compiling a 2–2 record with 4.88 ERA and 15 strikeouts in  innings pitched.

Baltimore Orioles
On March 27, 2021, Plutko was traded to the Baltimore Orioles in exchange for cash considerations. In 38 games for Baltimore, Plutko posted a 6.71 ERA with 44 strikeouts. On August 15, 2021, Plutko was designated for assignment by the Orioles. On August 19, Plutko cleared waivers and was assigned outright to the Triple-A Norfolk Tides. On October 4, Plutko elected free agency.

LG Twins
On December 9, 2021, Plutko signed a one-year contract worth $500,000, with an additional $300,000 in achievable incentives, with the LG Twins of the KBO League. On December 2, 2022, Plutko re-signed a one-year contract for the 2023 season worth $1.4 million.

References

External links

1991 births
Living people
People from Upland, California
Baseball players from California
College World Series Most Outstanding Player Award winners
Major League Baseball pitchers
Cleveland Indians players
Baltimore Orioles players
UCLA Bruins baseball players
Lake County Captains players
Carolina Mudcats players
Lynchburg Hillcats players
Akron RubberDucks players
Columbus Clippers players